Rupert I "the Red", Elector Palatine (9 June 1309, Wolfratshausen – 16 February 1390, Neustadt an der Weinstraße) was Count Palatine of the Rhine from 1353 to 1356, and Elector Palatine from 10 January 1356 to 16 February 1390.

He was the son of Rudolf I, Duke of Bavaria and Mechtild of Nassau, the daughter of Adolf of Nassau-Weilburg, King of Germany. With the death of his brother, Rudolf II, on 4 October 1353, he inherited his domains and became sole Count for the territory, whereas they had previously shared that privilege.

The Golden Bull of 1356 guaranteed the Palatinate the right of participating in the election of the Holy Roman Emperor.  Previous Counts Palatine had participated in other Imperial elections.

In 1386, Rupert founded Heidelberg University, the third university in the Holy Roman Empire, which was named after him.

Rupert was married twice: firstly to Elisabeth, Countess of Namur (daughter of John I, Marquis of Namur), secondly to Beatrix of Jülich-Berg, the great-granddaughter of his elder brother Adolf, Count Palatine of the Rhine.  Neither marriage produced an heir.

He was succeeded by his nephew, Rupert II, Elector Palatine, grandfather of his second wife.

References

1309 births
1390 deaths
House of Wittelsbach
Counts Palatine of the Rhine
Prince-electors of the Palatinate
Heidelberg University